Fernán Pérez Ponce de León (died 1291) was a senior Spanish noble.

He was son of Pedro Ponce de Cabrera, and a grandson of King Alfonso IX of León. He married Urraca Gutierrez de Meneses.

He was lord of Puebla de Asturias, Cangas and Tineo, Adelantado (governor) of the Andalucian frontier, and Mayordomo mayor (high steward) to Alfonso X of Castile.

References

Sources

Lords of Spain
1291 deaths
13th-century Castilians